The Men's 50 metre x 4 medley at the 2014 IPC Swimming European Championships was held at the Pieter van den Hoogenband Swimming Stadium, in Eindhoven from 4–10 August.

As with other disability relay events, the medley works on a points system whereby the classification numbers of each swimmer are totaled to give a number no higher than 20.

Medalists

See also
List of IPC world records in swimming

References

Medley relay 50 m mens